Ömer Topraktepe (born 2 March 1980 in İstanbul) is a Turkish retired footballer best known for his stints as a defender with Gençlerbirliği S.K. in the Süper Lig, and Türk Telekom GSK in the TFF First League.

Professional career
Topraktepe was a professional footballer in the top divisions of Turkey from 1999–2013. He made his professional debut with Gençlerbirliği S.K. in a 1–1 Süper Lig tie with Vanspor on 19 May 1999.

Personal life
Ömer is the brother of the footballer Serdar Topraktepe.

Honours
Gençlerbirliği
 Turkish Cup: 2000–01

References

External links
 
 

1980 births
Living people
Footballers from Istanbul
Turkey youth international footballers
Gençlerbirliği S.K. footballers
Ankaraspor footballers
Türk Telekom G.S.K. footballers
Süper Lig players
TFF First League players
TFF Second League players
Association football defenders
Association football forwards
Turkish footballers
Ünyespor footballers